Falak Sar (also known as Falak Sair) is the highest mountain peak in Ushu Valley of Swat, Pakistan at an elevation of , it is considered the highest peak of the Swat district in the Hindu Kush mountains range, followed by Mankial mountain peak.

Ascent History

This mountain was climbed for the first time by W.K.A Berry and C.H. Tyndale-Biscoe of New Zealand in 1957 from its North ridge. The second ascent was made by Dr. Wolf Gang Stephen who also climbed Distaghil Sar and Malika Parbat. Carlo Pinelli attempted another peak in the Hindu Raj which is the only 6000 of this part of Hindu Kush. They named it Maingol Sar.

Similarly, another ascent was made by a Japanese expedition from Yamaguchi University was composed of Yoshiyuki Nagahiro and Toshiyuki Akiyama. After traveling by car from Peshawar through Saidu Sharif, capital of Swat, to Matiltan, they continued on and headed up the Falak Sar valley, where at 11,000 feet on August 15 they established Base Camp. On August 20 they climbed Falak Sar (19,417 feet), which has had numerous previous ascents. After returning to Matiltan, they went through Kalam to the Amagal valley to an advanced base at 12,000 feet. They ascended the east side above their advanced base and reached a small peak which was called Maga Sar by the natives. They found no Miangul Sar (19,554 feet) but there was a peak called Par (c. 18,000 feet) in the position assigned the former peak.

On August 17, 2020 Hamza Anees along with his team members Ahmed Mujtaba and Adnan Saleem became first Pakistani to reach the summit of Falak Sar via north ridge.

See also
 List of mountains in Pakistan
 List of Ultras of the Karakoram and Hindu Kush

References

External links 

 Northern Pakistan detailed placemarks in Google Earth 

Tourist attractions in Swat
Swat Kohistan
Mountains of Khyber Pakhtunkhwa
Five-thousanders of the Hindu Raj